Tale of the Nine Tailed 1938 is an upcoming South Korean television series starring Lee Dong-wook, Kim Bum, Kim So-yeon, and Ryu Kyung-soo. The series serves as the second season to the 2020 series Tale of the Nine Tailed with storyline that prequel the former. It is scheduled to premiere on tvN in 2023.

Synopsis
Tale of the Nine Tailed 1938 tells the story where Lee Yeon (Lee Dong-wook) was dragged back in time to the year 1938 unexpectedly due to certain events that happened after Tale of the Nine Tailed where he met Lee Rang (Kim Bum) and Ryu Hong-joo (Kim So-yeon) of that era.

Cast

Main
 Lee Dong-wook as Lee Yeon
 Kim So-yeon as Ryu Hong-joo
 Kim Bum as Lee Rang
 Ryu Kyung-soo as Cheon Moo-young

Supporting

People around Lee Rang
 Jo Dal-hwan as Second Head

People around Ryu Hong-joo
 Kim Na-hyun as Nancho
 Kim Joo-young as Mae Hwa
 Kang Na-eon as Guk Hee

Others
 Woo Hyun-jin as Yeo Hyun
 Kim Seung-hwa as Yuki

References

External links
 

TVN (South Korean TV channel) television dramas
Korean-language television shows
Television series by Studio Dragon
South Korean action television series
South Korean fantasy television series
2023 South Korean television series debuts

Upcoming television series